Blow Your Pants Off is the second album by the American actor and comedian Jimmy Fallon. It was released on June 12, 2012. It features guest appearances from Paul McCartney, Bruce Springsteen, Justin Timberlake, Dave Matthews, Eddie Vedder, Brian Williams, Big & Rich and Stephen Colbert.  All of the recordings are originally from Late Night with Jimmy Fallon.

Most of the songs from the album were performed on the one-hour Jimmy Fallon's Primetime Music Special, which aired July 26, 2012 on NBC. The album won the Grammy Award for Best Comedy Album.

Reception
The album debuted at number 41 on the Canadian Albums Chart.
On February 10, 2013, the album won a Grammy Award for Best Comedy Album.

Track listing

Source:

References

2012 albums
Grammy Award for Best Comedy Album
Jimmy Fallon albums
Warner Records albums
2010s comedy albums